Georgian Basketball Federation, also known as GBF, is a national governing body of basketball in Georgia.

Presidents

See also 
Georgia national basketball team
Super League 

Basketball in Georgia (country)
Basketball